Terebra terryni is a species of sea snail, a marine gastropod mollusc in the family Terebridae.

Distribution
This marine species occurs off the Philippines.

Original description
 Poppe G.T., Tagaro S.P. & Goto Y. (2018). New marine species from the Central Philippines. Visaya. 5(1): 91-135. page(s): 111, pl. 12 figs 4-5.

References

External links
 Worms Link

Terebridae
Gastropods described in 2018